Kaur is an Estonian masculine given name and occasional surname derived from the given name and may refer to:

Kaur Alttoa (born 1947), Estonian historian
Kaur Kender (born 1971), Estonian author
Kaur Kivistik (born 1991), Estonian track and field athlete
Kaur Kuslap (born 1990), Estonian rower

Surname
Egon Kaur (born 1987), Estonian rally driver
Max Kaur (born 1969), Estonian politician

References

 
Masculine given names
Estonian masculine given names
Estonian-language surnames